Burnum Burnum (10 January 1936 – 17 August 1997) was an Aboriginal Australian sportsman, activist, actor, and author. He was a Woiworrung and Yorta Yorta man at Wallaga Lake in southern New South Wales. He was originally christened Harry Penrith but in 1976, he changed his name to Burnum Burnum ("Great Warrior") after his grandfather both to honor him and acknowledge his Aboriginal identity.[ Burnum Burnum at National Portrait Gallery]

Early life
Burnum Burnum was one of the Stolen Generations, taken from his parents when he was barely three months old. Featured on Late Night Live with Phillip Adams in 1999, the story of his early years graphically illustrates the brutality of the assimilation policy in the middle decades of the twentieth century. He was raised as an orphan and as a white person. He was called Harry Penrith, and was taught that white was good and black bad. He spent many years in children's homes run by the NSW Aborigines Welfare Board, most notably Kinchela Boys Home at Kempsey where he was abused; examples being beaten with a cattle whip for accidentally breaking a window with a cricket ball and being forced to say "Look at me and you will see that I am an Aborigine" in front of his class [ Farnsworth, Clyde H. Burnum Burnum, 61, Fighter For Australia's Aborigines, New York Times, Aug. 20, 1997] 

The Welfare Board promoted his achievements in rugby league and surf lifesaving at Kempsey in their publication Dawn magazine, and reported that he left Kinchela to become a pioneer Aboriginal employee in the NSW Public Service, working for the Department of Agriculture, where he remained for 13 years. But Stolen Generations people like Burnum, though raised "white", were often rejected by white society, leaving them with nothing. In the 1960s he searched for his Aboriginal identity and joined the battle for Aboriginal rights.

Sportsman
Burnum Burnum also played first grade Rugby Union for Parramatta, New South Wales, and both rugby league and cricket.

Activism
Burnum Burnum (aka Harry Penrith) first came into contact with the Bahá’í Faith in 1956, and formally identified as a Bahá’í in 1969. He later cited the consistent love shown to him by Bahá’ís as the reason for his becoming a Bahá'í and becoming active in teaching the Bahá'í Faith. In the early 1970's, he was elected  as one of nine members of Australia's Bahá'î administrative body (the National Spiritual Assembly of the Bahá'ís of Australia) and served with distinction. In 1975, he encountered American playwright and author, Tom Lysaght, at the Canberra Airport, invited Lysaght to his home and both introduced the fledgling young writer to the Bahá'í Movement and confirmed Lysaght in his new faith. [Bahaipedia, url=https://bahaipedia.org/Burnum_Burnum]  
Burnum Burnum became involved in Australian Indigenous rights activism while attending the University of Tasmaniain the late 1960s. He continued his activism work after becoming a Bahá’í, successfully campaigning for the skeleton of the last full-blooded Aboriginal of Tasmania [Truganini]to be released from being displayed in the Museum of Tasmania throughout the 1970's. It was released and cremated at her place of birth in 1976.[Farnsworth, Clyde H. Burnum Burnum, 61, Fighter For Australia's Aborigines, New York Times, Aug. 20, 1997] He was awarded a Churchill Fellowship in 1975 to study other Indigenous people.

He may be best remembered for planting the Aboriginal flag on the white cliffs of Dover on the Australian Bicentenary Day of 26 January 1988. This was his satirical way of claiming England, as Arthur Phillip had done to Burnum Burnum's homeland in 1788 when arriving with the First Fleet. However, Burnum stated that no harm would come to England's native people as a result of his invasion.[ Farnsworth, Clyde H. Burnum Burnum, 61, Fighter For Australia's Aborigines, New York Times, Aug. 20, 1997] A copy of the Burnum Burnum Declaration is on display among the Indigenous carvings and sculptures at the Enchanted Maze (a.k.a. Arthur's Seat Maze), Mornington Peninsula, Melbourne.

Acting
In 1983 Burnum Burnum appeared in Golden Dolphin Productions' Gold Hugo winning documentary Drought, narrating the indigenous legend of Tiddalik the giant frog. In 1986, Burnum Burnum played roles in three films. The first was Dark Age, a thriller set in outback and tropical Australia, and which also starred David Gulpillil as Burnum's son. The second was Ground Zero, a thriller containing themes critical of the British and Australian government's treatment of Indigenous Australians during nuclear weapon testing at Maralinga. The third was a satirical film, Marsupials: The Howling III, in which Burnum's character becomes a werewolf in the form of a Tasmanian tiger.

Burnum appeared as Uncle Albert in the 1992 TV series Bony, inspired by Arthur Upfield's novels about Bony, an Aboriginal detective.

Politics
Burnum stood for election to the Australian Senate, as an independent in New South Wales in the 1983 and 1984 Federal elections. He was also an Australian Democrats' candidate for the New South Wales Legislative Assembly in the 1988 North Shore state by-election.

Former Prime Minister John Howard described Burnum Burnum as "a very gracious man and very strongly committed to the welfare of Aboriginal Australians".

Death
In his later life Burnum Burnum lived in Woronora a suburb in the Sutherland Shire, where he was active in the local community. He died from heart disease on 17 August 1997, aged 61. His passing received considerable media coverage, including an obituary in the New York Times. [ Farnsworth, Clyde H. Burnum Burnum, 61, Fighter For Australia's Aborigines, New York Times, Aug. 20, 1997]  A portrait of Burnum Burnum now hangs in Sutherland Library. In 2005 Jannali Reserve was renamed Burnum Burnum Reserve in his honour.

References

1936 births
1997 deaths
Australian indigenous rights activists
Indigenous Australian actors
Indigenous Australian cricketers
Indigenous Australian rugby league players
Indigenous Australian rugby union players
People from the Sutherland Shire
Yorta Yorta people
Wurundjeri people